Orlando Mosquera (born 25 December 1994) is a Panamanian footballer who plays for Venezuelan club Carabobo and the Panama national team as a goalkeeper. Besides Panama, he has played in Venezuela, Bolivia, and Turkey.

Career
On the 1st of November 2015, Mosquera scored to tie Tauro 2-2 during the 90th minute. After that, he played for Tauro, helping them win the 2017 Panamanian top flight Clasura as well as the 2018 and 2019 Aperturas.

For the second half of 2019/20, he signed for Boluspor in the Turkish second division. In 2021, he signed for Always Ready.  In 2022, he signed for Carabobo.

References

External links
 

1994 births
Living people
Panamanian footballers
Sporting San Miguelito players
Tauro F.C. players
Boluspor footballers
TFF First League players
2017 CONCACAF Gold Cup players
2019 CONCACAF Gold Cup players
2021 CONCACAF Gold Cup players
Panamanian expatriate footballers
Expatriate footballers in Turkey
Panamanian expatriate sportspeople in Turkey
Association football goalkeepers
Panama international footballers